Cornelis Elout (Haarlem, 11 March 1714 - Haarlem, 3 November 1779) was a Haarlem regent, collector, one of the first members of Teylers Tweede Genootschap (Teylers Second or Scientific Society) and regent of the Armekinderhuis ("poor children's home"). Cornelis was the son of Jacob Elout and his wife Eva Cornelis dochter Akersloot Steyn. Cornelis Elout was the father of Cornelis Pieter Elout, who was council member and "hoofdschout" of Haarlem and Heer van Schoten.

After his death, Cornelis left a significant collection of paintings and drawings behind.

References and footnotes 

1714 births
1779 deaths
Members of Teylers Tweede Genootschap
People from Haarlem